The 2018 Saint Francis Cougars football team represented the University of Saint Francis, located in Fort Wayne, Indiana, in the 2018 NAIA football season. They were led by head coach Kevin Donley, who served in his 21st year as the first and only head coach in the history of Saint Francis football. The Cougars play their home games at Bishop John M. D'Arcy Stadium as members of the Mid-States Football Association (MSFA) Mideast League (MEL). The Cougars entered the season as back-to-back, two-time defending national champions.

Schedule

Game summaries

Robert Morris

The Cougars opened their back-to-back title defense with a home game against Robert Morris. The August home opener was the earliest opening date in the 21-year history of Cougar football.

In this game, the Cougars prevailed over RMU by a score of 42–9. The Cougars accumulated 208 yards passing and 180 yards rushing. The Cougars scored on 3 runs, 2 passes, and 1 kick-off return of 84 yards to open the second half. Transfer sophomore quarterback Matt Crable started his first game as a Cougar, completing 16 of 23 passes for 189 yards, good for 2 touchdowns and 1 interception. Justin Green ran for 113 yards and tallied 2 of the rushing touchdowns in addition to the kick-off return.

After a bye week, the Cougars resume play on the road in Joliet, Illinois. The Cougars face the MSFA's other USF, the St. Francis Fighting Saints.

St. Francis (IL)

The Cougars traveled to Joliet, Illinois in an MSFA crossover game against their namesake opponent from the Midwest League. At the final siren, the Indiana team won by a score of 49-19. It was a strong display on both offense and defense. The Cougars offense rolled up 534 yards of total offense while the defenders held the Fighting Saints to 208 yards. Defense against the rush was strong for each team. Cougar running back Justin Green was held to 51 net yards on 20 carries, an average of 2.6 yards per attempt. His longest run of the game was for 9 yards. The Cougars team was limited to 138 yards on 39 attempts, an average of 3.5 yard per carry. But their defense was even stingier, giving up 53 yards on 25 attempts, or 2.1 yard each try. Fighting Saints running back Dwayne Milton was the leading rusher in the game, netting 74 yards on 16 attempts, including a 35 yard run on the first play from scrimmage after the opening kick of the game.

Quarterback Matt Crable passed for 340 yards, finishing the game with 3 touchdown tosses and 0 interceptions. For the second game in a row, backup quarterback Clay Senerius also had a touchdown pass. The touchdown passes were 22 and 45 yards to Rocky James, 56 yards to Dan Ricksy, and 20 yards to Jahni Cooper. The other touchdowns were scored on a 1-yard run by Green, a 26-yard run by Eli Wallace, and a 21-yard pick-6 interception returned by Wilmer Cole.

St. Ambrose

The Cougars were effective at moving the ball forward, and they also had their share of moving the ball backward on penalties. The Cougars defeated the visiting St. Ambrose Fighting Bees 60-14. The Cougars collected 313 yards rushing on 42 attempts, or 7.5 yards per carry; they passed for 369 yards, connecting on 24 of 27 pass attempts and no interceptions; and they also had 244 yards on kick returns and an interception. For the second straight game, Wilmer Cole contributed a pick-6 interception return, and Mitchell Thornbury added a safety. Kicker Gavin Gardner opened the scoring with a field goal. On a down note, however, he lost his perfect season of point-after-touchdown kicks by hitting a goalpost, causing the ball to deflect wide in the second quarter.

The Cougars' offense was playing the game without their #1 running back Justin Green. Green was sidelined with an ankle injury that is expected to keep him out of play for only one week. Backup rushers took advantage of Green's absence to attain some impressive stats of their own. In a balanced attack, PJ Dean ran for 154 yards and 3 touchdowns, including one run of 76 yards. Eli Wallace added 79 yards and 1 touchdown, and Martell Williams contributed 76 yards and 1 touchdown. Quarterback Matt Crable added his second straight 300-yard game, throwing for 303 yards passing on 18 completions out of 20 attempts. The throws were good for 2 touchdowns, 1 each to Rocky James and Dan Ricksy. With the completion percentage of .900 (18/20), Crable established a new single-game record for Saint Francis quarterbacks attempting 20 or more passes in a game.

The Cougars' defense had an impressive game, holding the Bees' quarterback to 173 yards passing on 14 completions of 30 attempts. On 37 rushing attempts, the Bees achieved -29 yards. This was due to several tackles for losses, including 7 quarterback sacks totaling 35 yards.

For the game, the obvious shortfall for the Cougars was the number of penalties that were flagged. The Cougars received 17 penalties for an amazing 223 yards, including numerous calls for offensive holding and multiple plays that had multiple penalties called.

The Cougars are on the road again next Saturday. They return to Chicago to play the always-challenging Saint Xavier Cougars.

Saint Xavier

Two Saints, two Cougars, but only one could win. One hosting a Homecoming Day, the other a defending national champion. The scene was set for another rival game played without a trophy.

Saint Francis met its match as Saint Xavier's record coming into the game was deceptive. Two losses, one to the current #6 NAIA team, one to a Division I NCAA member. The swift, physical Saint Xavier defense provide many challenges for the USF offense. The SXU defenders recorded 5 sacks of quarterback Matt Crable, and they pressured him into several hurried pass attempts. On the day, Saint Xavier had more total yards, 327 to USF's 313. Saint Xavier won the passing battle 259 yards to 158. Saint Francis countered by winning the rushing contest 155 yards to 68. Each team's passes were only effective about half the time, with Saint Francis completing 16 of 30 attempts for 1 TD and no interceptions; Saint Xavier completed 23 of 44 attempts for 1 TD and 1 interception. The Saint Xavier TD was a 98-yard bomb that contributed much toward Saint Xavier's win in the offensive stats.

Right from the start, the defensive domination was noted. Saint Francis received the ball first after Saint Xavier deferred possession to the second half. The two teams traded several punts, and the first quarter ended in a scoreless tie.

The second quarter began with Saint Francis possessing the ball. Several plays, including two passes for 21 and 26 yards, moved the ball to the 1-yard line. PJ Dean rushed the ball for the game's first score. Dean was subbing as the main running back for the second straight game due to the absence of Justin Green with a minor injury. The extra point brought the score to 7-0 in favor of the visitors from Saint Francis.

Saint Xavier responded with a scoring drive of their own. But the drive stalled, so they kicked a field goal to trail 7-3.

With 2 minutes left in the half, Saint Francis forced and recovered a fumble at their own 45-yard line. In perhaps their most efficient drive of the day, Saint Francis moved down the field and scored with 20 seconds left, a 10-yard pass to Nick Brickens. The extra point gave USF a 14-3 lead at halftime.

After Saint Xavier punted when their 3rd quarter drive stalled, Saint Francis drove the ball down the field for another score. At 21-3, it looked like a blow-out was beginning. The next time USF got the ball, they punted again, this time a beauty that was downed on the SXU 2-yard line. But Saint Francis was stunned as a SXU receiver got behind a Saint Francis defender and raced down the sideline for a 98-yard TD. The play was the longest play ever completed against the Saint Francis defense. The extra point was missed, and the 3rd quarter ended 21-9.

The 4th quarter had drama of its own. A USF punt was blocked and returned for a Saint Xavier TD. That made the scored 21-16, and SXU was in upset mode. But later in the quarter, USF's Ryan Johnson intercepted a pass and returned it for a TD, the third straight game the defense had accomplished that feat. A failed extra point set the score at 27-16, close enough for a TD and field goal to tie the game. Saint Xavier scored the field goal on their next possession, bringing the score to 27-19 with 2:47 left in the game.

At that point, the USF defense stopped SXU one final time, and the victory was theirs.

During the game Saint Francis linebacker Piercen Harnish established the new record for tackles made in a career. He surpassed a former NAIA National Player of the Year, 2006 award-winner Brian Kurtz.

Marian

On paper, it was to be another classic rivalry game between these two respected NAIA football programs. One is the #1 two-time defending NAIA national champion;the other, currently #6, appeared in the championship game for two straight years before that, winning one title. Marian came in with the top-ranked offense in the MSFA Mideast League, while Saint Francis was #2. Marian came in with the #2 defense in the Mideast League, while Saint Francis was #3.

The classic game never materialized. Marian dominated in virtually all statistical aspects of the game, in a manner that was more one-sided than the final score suggested. Marian won, 37-28, but they controlled the game from both sides of the line with relative ease.

The team statistics were quite telling: Marian pounded out 480 yards of total offense while holding Saint Francis to just 140 yards. Marian passed for 167 yards while yielding just 72 yards to the Cougars. And the rushing was even more lopsided: Marian won the rushing portion of the contest with 313 yards while holding USF to just 68 yards. Perhaps the most telling stat was the time of possession. Marian's offense controlled the ball for 40:12 of the 60 minute game clock.

The game broke quickly in favor of Saint Francis. Marian won the coin toss and chose to defer possession until the second half. The opening kick was then returned 91 yards; the only thing that prevented a touchdown was a desperation lunge by the kicker that tripped up sophomore runner Matt Kominkiewicz. From the Marian 9-yard line, Saint Francis needed 4 plays to push into the end zone for a quick 7-0 lead.

Marian took the following kickoff and marched down the field before their drive stalled. Their possession ended with a field goal attempt that sailed wide of the goalposts. The game then settled into a defensive struggle as the teams traded punts for most of the rest of the first quarter. The next break for Saint Francis when a fumble was recovered by the Cougars at Marian's 17 yard line. It took the Cougars four plays to score early in the second quarter to extend the lead to 14-0.

Marian's offense finally started clicking, and they scored on their next two possessions before the half. Missing one extra point attempt left USF ahead at halftime , 14-13.

The second half began with Marian receiving the kick and moving only 6 yards. They punted the ball, and they regained possession of the ball when USF call.ed for a fair catch and then fumbled the catch attempt. It took Marian just three plays to reach the endzone and take a 20-14 lead.

That Marian score was the first time this season that the Cougars had trailed in a game. When the following USF drive died, the Cougars punted the ball. Marian's had a drive going, advancing to their own 31-yard line. But on the next play, the Marian quarterback fumbled the snap, and USF defender Marcus Stepp scooped the ball and returned it for a 31-yard touchdown. This was the fourth consecutive game in which the Saint Francis had contributed to the scoring with a turnover returned for a touchdown. With the extra point kick, Saint Francis regained the lead, 21-20.

Marian was not impressed. They took the next kickoff and drove 61 yards on only four plays to regain the lead 27-21. After Saint Francis punted once again, Marian consumed over 8 minutes on the clock. They drove 92 yards for another score, extending the lead to 34-21.

Finally, Saint Francis responded with a meaningful drive of their own. They marched 73 yards in only six plays, scoring a TD in less than three minutes of clock. That score left the Cougars trailing 34-28. But the score was too little, too late; Marian controlled the ball again, this time marching down and kicking a field goal to extend their lead to nine with nine seconds left on the game's clock. USF's fate was sealed. Their winning streak had been ended by the same team who had given them their last previous loss. (In fact, the Cougars' last three losses, dating back to 2015, have all come at the hands of the Marian Knights.)

The Cougars won 27 consecutive games during the run. Fans can find hope knowing that the Cougars rebounded from that last loss in 2016 to go on and claim their first national championship. The game revealed several things that can be worked on between now and a possible rematch when the yearly play-off season comes. Once again, Saint Francis played the game without their primary running back, Justin Green, playing at full strength. Green suited for the game, but his action was limited to 7 carries for 31 yards. After his last action, Green limped off the field. This was the fourth consecutive game that Green has either missed or seen limited playing action. Defensive pressure kept forcing quarterback Matt Crable to rush out of the pocket, hurry his throws or take sacks.

The Franciscan Bowl trophy was awarded to Marian as winner of this rival game. Marian now leads the trophy series, 2-1, while the entire Marian-Saint Francis rivalry is now tied with seven wins each. The game was played in front of a standing-room only crowd of 4,579.

Concordia

The anticipated rebound from last week's defeat never materialized. Once again, the Cougars experienced an upset loss, this time at the hands of the Concordia Cardinals. It was a defensive struggle. Our defense made only one mistake, but our offense was non-existent. After playing a scoreless first half, the Cougars kicked a field goal in the third quarter to take a lead, 3-0. The kick was Gavin Gardner's second attempt on the day, having missed a long field goal attempt to end the first half. But Concordia trumped our score with a touchdown in the fourth quarter. That was all the scoring; after 60 minutes of play, Concordia walked off the field with a 7-3 victory.

The loss hurt on many levels. It was the first time Saint Francis had lost two consecutive games since October 11, 2014. It was the first time the team lost to someone other than the Marian Knights since that same date, in a year when the Cougars lost three games in a row on their way to a 6-5 regular season with no subsequent playoff participation. That was the last time USF had lost two or more conference games. It was the first time that the Cougars had ever lost a game to Concordia. And perhaps most painful, the three-point production was the lowest score ever generated by any regular season team in the history of Saint Francis football.

Both defenses excelled at pressuring the offense and getting off the field. USF won the total offense battle, 231 yards to 174. The Cougars outgained Concordia through the air, 229 yards to just 63 yards by the home team. But the rushing offense was dominated by Concordia as the Cardinals tallied 111 yards to just 2 net yards by the Cougars. The Cougar effort was devastated by a whopping 10 quarterback sacks for a total of 62 yards. The leading Cougar rusher, PJ Dean, ran for 68 yards. But that effort was overshadowed by Concordia's Joe Conner, who gained 95 yards.

Each offense was limited to just one big play. USF's passing yards included one play for 57 yards, a fourth quarter trick play executed to try to get the offense moving. On the play, quarterback Matt Crable completed a short toss to Rocky James, who almost immediately turned hook-and-ladder style and lateraled the ball to Dan Ricksy. Ricksy sped down the right sideline for what looked to become a touchdown. Then, as a Concordia defender pushed Ricksy out of bounds, Dan turned and lateraled the ball back to an oncoming Will Chrisman. Chrisman advanced the ball several yards more, but the official ruled that Ricksy was out of bounds before he completed the toss.

Concordia's one big play was even more dramatic. On a fourth-and-2 play, running back took the ball to the left. He crossed the line of scrimmage near the left sideline before abruptly working his way across the field. After 31 yards, Conner had scored a touchdown, entering the end zone near the right sideline. The score gave Concordia the lead and the eventual win in the ballgame.

Injuries continued to impact the Cougars. Once again, running back Justin Green sat out the entire game. And defensive All-American Piercen Harnish was seen on the field for only one play when he lined up as protection on a punt. He sustained a noticeable injury in last week's loss to Marian.

With the second conference loss, Saint Francis now finds itself in the anxious position of needing some help to make the postseason to try to defend their back-to-back national titles. A third loss will almost certainly move them out of any hope to play in the postseason. The two losses means they will likely not be their conference champion, and that means the Cougars will need to finish high enough in the rankings to receive an at-large invitation to play in the playoffs. (Every conference champion who finishes ranked in the top 20 in the final regular season poll will receive an automatic berth in the playoff field; there are 12 conferences, so it is possible that only four at-large invitations will be available.)

Simply stated, the Cougar offense needs to get better production. From sputtering in recent games to nonexistent in the most recent contest, the Cougars have struggled on a significant number of recent offensive drives. In the Concordia game, quarterback Matt Crable attempted 34 passes for 229 yards and one interception. He ran the ball 12 times for a loss of 66 yards and one lost fumble. That's 46 plays for 163 yards net, or about 3.5 yards per play. The Cougars only ran 67 plays during the game. Whether the low output is attributed to poor blocking by the offensive line or poor execution on the part of the quarterback, or some combination of the two, things simply must get better.

The Cougars' next test will be their next game. Undefeated and top-25-ranked Siena Heights will visit Fort Wayne for another conference match. The Siena Heights defense is another highly regarded group, and they will bring a challenge that will be comparable to the one faced in the two recent contests against Marian and Concordia. To get another shot at being the best, the Cougars will need to beat the best.

Siena Heights

It was an exciting Homecoming game, and those who stayed until the end were treated to one of the best comebacks in the history of Saint Francis Cougar football. With 1:17 left on the game clock, Siena Heights was leading by a score of 12-11. They scored another touchdown and extra point to extend the lead to 19-11. Many fans began filing out of Saint Francis stands, certain that their team would fall in their third consecutive loss to a conference and nationally ranked team.

But USF snatched victory out of the jaws of defeat. They took the following kickoff and brought it to their own 34-yard line. So, with 1:12 left in the game, the Cougars needed to travel 66 yards for a chance to tie the score. After 2 incomplete passes and a quarterback sack of 7 yards, USF faced a fourth-down play that became a pivotal moment in the contest. Quarterback Matt Crable completed a 27-yard sideline pass to the Saints' 41-yard line, and Siena Heights regrouped by calling a timeout with 42 seconds left. On the next two plays, Crable dropped back to pass but chose instead to run the ball through two large holes that presented themselves. The two plays were good for 14- and 15-yards, advancing the ball to the Saints' 12-yard line.

Crable spiked the ball to stop the clock on the next play. The following play saw a Siena Heights personal foul advance the ball half the distance to the goal and resulted in another Cougars' first down. Crable ran a keeper play for 3 yards, and another Siena Heights penalty gave the Cougars another first down. The drive was completed when Crable handed the ball to running back PJ Dean. But instead of running into the end zone, Dean pulled up short of the line of scrimmage and completed a touchdown toss to a waiting Dylan Hunley. With 11 seconds left on the clock, the Cougars were within 2 points with the all-important 2-point conversion yet to be tried.

The Cougars executed another trick play to score the needed 2 points. The play first started to the left, but Crable flipped the ball to a reversing wide receiver, Dan Ricksy. Once again, Ricksy pulled up short of the line of scrimmage, jumped into the air, and completed the conversion pass to Will Chrisman. The Cougars had tied the score, 19-19.

Overtime followed, and Siena Heights won the coin toss to take possession of the ball first. Three plays advanced the ball 10 yards for a first down at the USF 15. Another run moved the ball a yard to the USF 14. The Saints were in position for a field goal attempt, but they continued to try for a touchdown. After one incomplete pass, the next pass attempt was intercepted by the Cougars' Blake Schumaker. The ball was returned 14 yards, and the ball control was given to USF at the same 25-yard line where Siena Heights had just begun their drive.

PJ Dean rushed the ball 1 yard, followed by Crable rushing the ball for 5 yards. Another Dean rush was good for 8 yards, giving the Cougars first down at the Saints' 11-yard line. Dean then rushed the ball for 4 yards. On second down, Dean took the ball again and made sure he was tackled in the middle of the field in a play designed for field goal placement. On third down, Gavin Gardner kicked a 26-yard field goal, and the comeback was complete. The Cougars won, 22-19.

The Cougars actually got into position to tie (and then win) the game with another odd 2-point conversion. With the Cougars leading 9-6 in a game where the only scoring was 5 field goals, Siena Heights scored the first touchdown of the contest early in the fourth quarter to take a 12-9 lead. But the Cougars' Marcus Stepp blocked the following extra point kick, and the live ball was scooped up by Wilmer Cole and returned the length of the field in a touchdown-like fashion. The Cougars were awarded the two points that are normally given for a rushing conversion attempt. That made the score 12-11 in favor of the Saints; their touchdown had only resulted in a four-point swing in the score difference. That "win" for the Cougars would prove to be vital to put them into position to win as the game's final moments unfolded.

Kicker Gavin Gardner's four field goals in one contest set a new record for most USF field goals in one game. In other game trivia, early in the fourth quarter, USF defender Stan Jackson was thrown out of the game after the officials claimed he targeted one of the Siena Heights' receivers. That kind of infraction is normally followed by a suspension from the following game. But Coach Kevin Donley submitted a protest of the call to the governing body, and they overturned the on-the-field call. Jackson was suited up and able to play in the following week's game against Missouri Baptist.

Missouri Baptist

The schedule finally eased a bit as the Cougars faced a non-ranked opponent. In their final home game of the season, the Cougars offense came alive. The final result was a Senior Day victory by a score of 51-7. The Cougars controlled all aspects of the contest, outgaining the Spartans in total yards, 438-166. The Spartan's rushing game, which featured one of the Mid-States' conference-best in Chris Baldwin, was held to 49 net yards on 34 attempts. Baldwin was held to 48 yards net, his lowest production of the season.

In contrast, the Cougars gained 237 net rushing yards on 39 attempts. The load was spread equally among three players. Matt Crable and Martell Williams each netted 74 yards rushing, and PJ Dean added 73 yards of his own. Passing yardage was won by USF, 201-117. Matt Crable completed 17 of 24 attempts for 180 yards and 3 touchdowns and no interceptions.

The Cougars led 24-0 at half-time, and the lead was extended to 37-0 before Missouri Baptist got on the scoreboard. The Cougars completed the scoring with 14 fourth-quarter points. The game was decided early. Saint Francis nearly ran back the opening kick-off for a touchdown, with Cougar Stan Jackson - who was not expected to play this game because of his previous-game targeting violation - being driven out of bounds at the 2-yard line. A penalty brought the ball back to midfield, but a few plays later the Cougars contributed their first score.

After last week when Jackson was tossed out of that game, Cougar coach Kevin Donley appealed the suspension to the governing body. The body agreed with Donley; the call was overturned, and Jackson was allowed to suit up this week.

In the third quarter, Dan Ricksy succeeded in returning a kick for a touchdown. He returned a punt 50 yards for his contribution to the game's final score. Gavin Gardner added a field goal and the back-up kicker, senior Brandon Grasha, added 3 of the extra point kicks.

Lindenwood-Belleville

The fans who made the trip to the St. Louis area to Belleville, Illinois were treated to a game that had many things you are lucky to see once in a lifetime. Yet this one game included them all.

The game pace was set quickly as Lindenwood won the coin toss and elected to defer possession until the second half. The Cougars received the opening kickoff and returned it 2 yards to their own 17-yard line. A 5-yard penalty against the Lynx gave the Cougars a chance for a re-kick, which they accepted. This time, a poorer kick and a better return advanced the ball to the Cougars' 45-yard line; the election to re-kick had given the Cougars 28 yards of forward progress. On the first play from scrimmage, PJ Dean rushed for 30 yards to the Lynx 25-yard line. Five plays later, the Cougars were in the end zone with a three-yard touchdown pass. They added the extra point for a 7-0 advantage.

The kickoff was returned by the Lynx to their own 23-yard line. The Lynx quarterback attempted a pass on their first play, and the ball was intercepted and returned 30 yards for a touchdown by Wilmer Cole. With still more than 12 minutes left in the opening quarter, the Cougars held a 14-0 lead. The interception by Cole was his third pick-6 touchdown return of the season, setting a new USF team record for most interceptions returned for a touchdown in a single season.

The Saint Francis defense held on the next possession, and the ball returned to the Cougars after an unsuccessful attempt on 4th down to the Lynx 48-yard line. After a 5-yard penalty, the Cougars executed three consecutive plays of 15 yards or more, moving the ball to the Lynx 5-yard line. The drive was completed with a 4-yard TD pass to Will Chrisman. That completed the 21 points scored in the first quarter.

Once again, the USF defense held on the next Lynx drive, and a punt gave USF possession again at their own 12-yard line. After a couple of plays, quarterback Matt Crable was replaced by backup Clay Senerius. Senerius and the offense advanced the ball to the Lynx 6-yard line. A key play in the drive was a 27-yard pass completion to Jordan Schmeling. But the drive stalled there, and Gavin Gardner kicked a 34-yard field goal early in the second quarter for a 24-point lead.

The ball returned to the Lindenwood offense. After an unsuccessful 3-and-out sequence, the Lynx lined up to punt. But the kick was blocked by Eric Dunten, and USF defender Malachi Manion recovered the ball and ran it back 20 yards for another touchdown.

Yet again, the USF defense forced a punt after a brief bit of Lindenwood success on offense. Their punt was returned to the USF 10-yard line, and a 5-yard penalty moved it back to force the Cougars to begin from their own 5-yard line. Crable returned as the quarterback, and he led a 95-yard drive for yet another touchdown. The drive featured a 58-yard pass completion to Rocky James. The final play was a 35-yard touchdown rush by Crable. The added extra point made the score USF 38, Lindenwood 0.

Another Lindenwood drive stalled. The Lynx punter booted the ball to the USF 24-yard line, where it was collected by Dan Ricksy. Ricksy returned the ball the entire 76 yards to the goal line for another Cougar touchdown, his second touchdown return in as many games. For his effort, Ricksy was named Mid-States Football Conference special teams Player-of-the-Week for the second successive week. There was still 5:22 left in the second quarter as USF extended their lead to 45-0.

After the extra point kick, tempers flared. A Lindenwood player followed the USF team back to the USF side of the field, voicing his disturbance about something. He was soon joined by 2 other Lynx players who left their bench on the other side of the field to race across and join the display of emotion. Both benches soon gathered around, and the game was delayed for a few moments while the officials sorted the players and returned order.

After the altercation, Lindenwood was penalized an unprecedented three successive times of 15 yards each, an unsportsmanlike conduct penalty awarded against the original three Lynx players. Instead of being kicked from the Cougars own 25-yard line, the ball was moved 45 yards forward to the Lynx 30-yard line. The Cougars were in field goal position! They had no other alternative to kicking an on-side squib, which the Cougars successfully recovered. Once again, the Cougars had the ball. But mercy stepped in, and the Cougars were limited to a field goal after a three-and-out possession. The score advanced the USF lead to 48-0, and we were still in the first half.

The Lynx received the following kickoff, and a touchback gave them possession at their own 35-yard line. By now, most of the USF defenders had exited the game, and substitutes were on the field. Before the half ended, Lindenwood was finally able to put together a successful drive of their own. They moved the ball 65 yards for a touchdown, a drive that featured a 44-yard pass completion. With the extra point kick, the score became USF 48, Lindenwood 7. Shortly after, the first half ended.

The second half was (mostly) controlled by Lindenwood. Lindenwood actually scored more points, 18-16. Operating against USF substitutes, the Lindenwood offense scored three touchdowns. Oddly, each of the scores resulted in only six points as each extra-point effort was stopped. Dunten blocked another kick, a two-point try failed, and another kick was blocked.

Blocked kicks were a highlight of the day: in addition to the three already mentioned, USF blocked another punt. This time, the kicker was in the end zone, and the ball went out of bounds before anyone could recover it. That resulted in a safety and two more points for the Cougars.

With no USF scoring in the third quarter, their first-team offense was returned to the game in the fourth quarter. After the safety, they scored on a 65-yard drive that ended with a 22-yard touchdown pass from Crable to Dan Ricksy.

The final scoring of the day came after Lindenwood's last touchdown. USF recovered an on-side kick at the 50-yard line. From here, third-team quarterback Danny Naylor led a 50-yard drive that ended with a 16-yard rushing touchdown by Tony Johnson.

The full day came to an end when the Lynx quarterback was tackled for a loss. With several seconds left on the clock, he remained down. He did not get up until time had fully expired. In light of the heated emotions that had been displayed earlier in the game, the two sides did not exchange mid-field handshakes when play concluded.

The win was a milestone victory for coach Kevin Donley. It moved Donley into a 7th place tie with legendary coach Bear Bryant on the all-time wins list for college football. With his next victory, Donley will become the sole holder of the 7th-place position.

Taylor

The pre-playoff playoff season continued with a road game regular season finale in Upland, Indiana. A Taylor win would likely have brought a repeat of the 2009 season. That year, a final game road loss at Taylor ended the Cougar hopes for the playoffs as the Trojans handed USF their 3rd loss of the season. On the other hand a Saint Francis victory would be appreciated for a couple of reasons.

First, a win would be the 324th of Kevin Donley's collegiate coaching career, a number that would give him sole possession of 7th place on the all-time list of college wins. Donley entered the game in a tie with Bear Bryant, the legend best known for his coaching days at the University of Alabama, but perhaps more importantly, a win would give the Cougars a likely first-round home game in the playoffs. The Cougars entered the game ranked #9 in the latest 2018 NAIA football rankings. The top 8 teams in the final regular season poll host the first-round games. A win this week would likely move the Cougars up at least one position in the rankings because this week also featured a game with the current #8 team visiting the current #5 team. The loser of that game would likely slip below Saint Francis in the polls.

Saint Francis won the coin toss, and they elected to defer possession until the second half. They kicked off to Taylor, and their defense forced a punt on that first possession. A fair catch gave the ball to USF at their own 39-yard line. It took the Cougars seven plays to move the 61 yards for a touchdown, scored on a 4-yard rush by quarterback Matt Crable. The drive featured a 19-yard pass to Dylan Hunley and a 22-yard rush by PJ Dean. The extra point snap was muffed, resulting in no extra point kick. The Cougars had to settle for a lead of 6-0.

On the next Taylor possession, the Cougar defense held again, and the Trojans punted again. The punt was returned, and the Cougars possession once again began at their own 39-yard line. And once again, the Cougars marched 61 yards for a touchdown. The scoring play was a 6-yard jet sweep by Jordan Schmeling. The drive also included pass completions of 15 yards and 26 yards to, respectively, Kyle May and Dylan Hunley. This time the kick was good, extending the lead to 13-0.

Another Taylor punt came after their offense was held to a three-and-out performance. This time, Saint Francis took possession at their own 43-yard line, 4 yards better than their first two drives. That was the only difference. The first quarter ended, and play moved to the second period. Then this possession ended with another Cougar touchdown to complete the 57-yard drive. Dan Ricksy scored the touchdown on a 7-yard pass. Another good kick made the score 20-0.

The teams then traded possessions. Taylor turned over the ball on an interception by Blake Schumaker, and Saint Francis lost the ball on a fourth-down sack of their quarterback. Taylor capitalized on the play by driving for a score with 19 seconds left in the half. That made the score USF 20, Taylor 7.

A Stan Jackson return of the following kick gave Saint Francis great field position. Their drive started at the Taylor 39-yard line with 13 seconds left in the half. A 14-yard pass moved the ball to the Taylor 25-yard line with just 1 second on the clock. USF's Gavin Gardner used that last tick to kick a 42-yard field goal. The halftime score was USF 23, Taylor 7.

The highlight of the third quarter was a 46-yard field goal by Gardner. It was thought to be the longest field goal in Saint Francis history, moving the margin to 26-7. But that margin didn't last long. Taylor returned the following kick 41 yards, giving them possession at their 42-yard line. A pair of 12 yard rushes and a 28-yard touchdown pass made the score 26-13. The score stayed that way when Cougar linebacker Eric Dunten blocked the extra point try.

The final score was a win of 40-20. USF scored twice in the 4th quarter on a 43-yard rush by Matt Crable and a 14-yard pass completion from Crable to Will Chrisman. Taylor also drove the ball one more score.

For the day, Crable had a nice effort of passing, completing 21 of 31 for 265 yards, 2 touchdowns and no interceptions.
Crable also led the Cougar rushers, gaining 96 yards and scoring another 2 touchdowns.

With their final regular season game, the Cougars have a bye week next week before they learn the details of their playoff seeding. The first playoff game will be in two weeks, on November 17.

Grand View

Saint Francis began their quest for a third consecutive championship with a home game against the Grand View Vikings. The Cougars looked strong on both offense and defense as they prevailed, 34-3.

Grand View came into the game as the #1-ranked rushing defense in the NAIA, and Saint Francis was ranked #3. At the end of the game, Saint Francis had outrushed Grand View, 272 yards to 65 yards. USF had two different runners who outproduced the entire Grand View team. PJ Dean ran for 102 yards on 12 attempts, and Justin Green ran for 97 yards on 
19 attempts. Not far behind was Matt Crable, who added 51 yards to the total.

Total yards passing was also won by the Cougars, 166-73. Crable was 13-of-20 passing for 3 touchdowns and no interceptions. More than half of Crable's passes were caught by Rocky James. James' seven receptions were good for 93 yards and 2 touchdowns. For his effort, James was named the game's Most Outstanding Offensive Player.

The Outstanding Defensive Player was James Jamicich. On this day, his 5 tackles included 2.5 sacks and 3.5 tackles for a loss.

The Cougars defense would have had a shutout were it not for one extra play at the end of the first half. On the last play before time expired, the Cougars intercepted a desperation pass in their endzone. But a 15-yard penalty on the play advanced the ball, and Grand View was given one last untimed down. The penalty moved the ball into field goal range, and the Grand View kicker split the goalposts to put the Vikings' only 3 points on the scoreboard.

In the category of trivia, Grand View played the entire game without one penalty being called on their team.

An odd set of circumstances combined to give the Cougars another home game in the quarterfinal round. Exactly four teams were upset in the first round of play, meaning four of the eight remaining teams have seedings that are higher than USF. As one of the top four teams remaining, the Cougars will play at least one more game in 2018 at Bishop D'Arcy Stadium.

Baker

The game featured a rematch between the two opponents from the 2016 national championship game. It was an evenly-matched game, with Baker edging out Saint Francis in most offensive categories. Baker rushed for 137 yards, and USF rushed for 132 yards. Baker running back JD Woods, the NAIA's leading rusher coming into the game, was held to 73 yards net, about 50 yards below his per game average. Baker passed for 200 yards, and Saint Francis threw for 186 yards. But the score sided with Saint Francis, by a final margin of 33-23.

Baker opened the scoring with the only score of the first quarter. The two teams ended the first three possessions with punts, giving Saint Francis their second possession of the day. After a couple first downs, the Cougars' drive stalled. On fourth down, they lined up for another punt. But the ball was snapped over the punter's head, and he recovered it for a 33-yard loss that gave Baker the ball at the USF 30-yard line. Two plays produced a 5-yard loss to the 35-yard line. But the next play was a flare-out to JD Woods, who was also a skilled pass receiver. He sped 35 yards to the end zone. After the extra point kick was good, Baker led 7-0.

The Saint Francis offense responded on the next drive with a score of their own. They drove 66 yards to the end zone; the drive was capped by a 3-yard rushing touchdown by PJ Dean. The kick after the score was good, and the game was tied 7-7.

It took the Cougars only 38 more seconds to take the lead. Baker started its next possession, and the first play produced an interception to Jalen Moss. He was dropped immediately at the Baker 30-yard line. The very next play produced the score for the Cougars on a 30-yard pass completion to Dan Ricksy. After a successful kick, USF led 14-7.

The Cougars kicked-off with a short, high pooch kick that was intended to catch Baker by surprise. But Baker recovered the 20-yard kick, which actually resulted in a 5-yard loss. They had a nice starting position at their own 40-yard line. Baker drove the ball for an apparent game-tying touchdown. But the extra point was missed, so Saint Francis maintained the lead, 14-13. USF scored on the following possession. But they also missed a kick, and the score at halftime was USF 20, Baker 13.

After the two teams traded a couple of possessions in the second half, Saint Francis put together a 72-yard scoring drive, aided largely by a 42-yard pass completion to Dylan Hunley. A 16-yard touchdown pass to Dan Ricksy completed the drive. But once again, the Cougars had after-touchdown woes. The extra point attempt failed once again, leaving USF with a 26-13 lead.

On their next drive, Baker moved the ball into position to kick a 46-yard field goal, closing the score the 26-16. Saint Francis drove the ball on their next possession, but the drive ended early in the fourth quarter with a goal-line interception by a Baker defender. The ball was returned to the Baker 15-yard line.

The Cougar defense held, and a punt returned possession to USF. But on the first play of that possession, PJ Dean fumbled the ball, and it was recovered by Baker at the USF 34-yard line. Baker advanced to the Cougar 22-line. But the next play produced the defensive play-of-the-game for the Cougars. A hand-off was mishandled, and the ball was fumbled backward for a 3-yard loss. At that point, Cougars defensive end Mitchell Thornbury scooped up the ball. He raced 75-yards down the sideline, outmaneuvering two Baker players who tried to force a fumble of their own. Thornbury maintained control of the ball, and he landed in the end zone with a score on the turnover. A successful kick extended the Cougar lead to 33-16.

Baker scored one last time, with 5:15 left on the game clock. That was the final score in the game. Saint Francis punted, and Baker turned the ball over on downs before USF ran out the clock with a couple of plays from the victory formation.

Morningside

The location changed, but the semifinal match was a replay of last year's game between Morningside and USF. This season, Morningside brought an undefeated record to the contest. When the Cougars lost the #1 ranking earlier in the year, it was Morningside who stepped in to claim the top spot, and they maintained that spot throughout the rest of the season. Morningside featured the top-scoring offense in the entire NAIA, as well as the #1 defense for points and yards allowed. This game was the third straight time the two teams met in the postseason tournament.

The game was played in blizzard-like conditions, with strong-and-steady winds literally blowing the falling snow sideways. Significant amounts of snow had to be removed from the field before, during, and after the contest, and temperatures hovered around the mid-30s all afternoon.

The opening coin toss was won by Saint Francis, and they elected to defer possession of the ball. USF chose to kick into the strong wind so they would benefit from its presence in the second quarter. That may have been the turning point of the game as Morningside scored twice after only three offensive plays. The opening kick was returned to the 50-yard line. On the first play from scrimmage, Morningside quarterback Trent Solsma completed a touchdown pass to wide receiver Connor Niles. After only 14 seconds had elapsed, Morningside led 7-0.

Morningside kicked off, and USF failed to move the ball for a first down. A three-and-out punt returned possession to Morningside at their 48-yard line. A Morningside run went for 22 yards, moving the ball to the USF 30-yard line. On the next play, Solsma lofted another touchdown pass. With 12:15 left in the first quarter, Morningside extended its lead to 14-0.

A touchback gave USF the ball at their own 25-yard line. A 31-yard pass completion to Dylan Hunley moved the ball into Morningside territory. But the drive netted 4 yards on the next 3 plays, and USF punted again, this time giving Morningside a start from their own 12-yard line. The USF defense was effective on that possession, and a 3-and-out punt returned the ball to the Cougars at the Morningside 48-yard line.

Saint Francis used the good field position to ignite their first score of the day. Two plays and a 32-yard pass to Dylan Hunley game USF a first down at the Morningside 15-yard line. It took two more plays to score, a 13-yard pass from Crable to PJ Dean. The extra point made the score 14-7.

Morningside was unfazed. Their offense posted a 59-yard touchdown drive on the next possession to return the 2-score lead, 21-7. With all this scoring, there was still 5:04 left in the first quarter. Morningside kicked off, and USF once again failed to move the ball. They punted the ball back to the Mustangs, and Morningside took over at their own 41-yard line. They moved the ball downfield, gaining two first downs before the USF defense stopped them. On the last play of the drive, Solsma was stunned by a Cougar defender on a pass that was broken up for a downfield incompletion. Morningside took a timeout and considered inserting their backup quarterback into the game, but in the end, they opted to attempt a 41-yard field goal. But USF's defense blocked the kick, and the score remained 21-7 as the first quarter clock expired.

The block motivated the Cougar offense. Three rushing plays advanced the ball to midfield, exactly on the 50-yard line. A 25-yard run by PJ Dean advanced to Morningside's 25-yard line. A 5-yard run and a 5-yard pass gave the Cougars another first down at the 15-yard line. And the drive was concluded with a 15-yard touchdown pass from Crable to Will Chrisman. With the extra point, Saint Francis trailed by 7 points, 21-14 with 11:08 left in the first half.

At this point, the game reached a stalemate. Morningside consumed over 7 minutes in a 17-play drive before eventually turning the ball over on downs. Saint Francis then lost the ball on a fumble; Morningside lost the ball on an interception; and Saint Francis had another punt blocked to give Morningside the ball at the USF 26-yard line. Two pass completions later, Morningside was in the end zone again. With 3 seconds left on the first half clock, Morningside's score extended the lead back to 14 points, 28-14. That is how the half ended.

Saint Francis got back into the ballgame by holding Morningside scoreless in the second half. They scored a touchdown in each of the third and fourth quarters to tie the game and send it to overtime. In the third quarter, Piercen Harnish intercepted a Solsma pass at the goal line to prevent another Morningside score. He returned the ball to the USF 20-yard line. It took Saint Francis only 4 plays to move the 80 yards for a touchdown. Featured in the drive was a 35-yard pass completion from Crable to Rocky James. The score was made on a 29-yard pass completion from Crable to Dylan Hunley. Adding the extra point brought USF back to within 7 points, now trailing 28-21.

After the next kickoff, Morningside advanced the ball to the USF 5-yard line and was threatening another score. But the USF defense stepped up. Pass incompletions and a penalty moved the ball back to the 10-yard. Then the drive was halted as USF forced a fumble that Morningside recovered for a 17-yard loss. As a result of the failed 4th down play, the ball was given to USF.

With 6:25 left in the fourth quarter, Saint Francis began the drive that tied the score. Morningside punted the ball from deep inside their own territory, and Saint Francis began possession at the Morningside 44-yard line. A running play lost 3 yards, but then two consecutive pass completions to Rocky James moved the ball 46 yards to the 1-yard line. PJ Dean completed the drive with a rushing play. The all-important extra point was good once again, and the score was tied, 28-28. The teams traded punts, and USF then held Morningside scoreless the last 98 seconds to send the game to overtime.

Morningside won the coin toss and elected to defer their possession. In overtime, each team gets one chance to start from 25 yards away from the goal line. Saint Francis began with a running play and 2 pass incompletions that moved the ball 1 yard. They opted to try a 42-yard field goal from the 24-yard line, but the kick was wide to the right, and no score was posted. On Morningside's first play from scrimmage (does this sound familiar?), a 25-yard pass from Solsma to Connor Niles was grabbed for the winning score. No extra point was needed, so Morningside claimed a 34-28 OT win and made plans to play for the national championship in two weeks. (Morningside won that game, 35-28, to claim their first national championship with an undefeated, 15-0 record.)

National awards and honors
   Senior linebacker Piercen Harnish was announced as a finalist for the William V. Campbell Trophy. This award is considered by many to be the academic equivalent to the Heisman Award. With the nomination, Harnish joined his older brother Chandler, formerly a quarterback at Northern Illinois University, who was nominated for the same honor by the National Football Foundation in 2011.

Ranking movements

References

Saint Francis
Saint Francis Cougars football seasons
Saint Francis Cougars football